Bacolod-Kalawi, officially the Municipality of Bacolod-Kalawi (Maranao and Iranun: Inged a Bacolod-Kalawi), is a 3rd class municipality in the province of Lanao del Sur, Philippines. According to the 2020 census, it has a population of 23,129 people.

Formerly known as Bacolod Grande, it was changed into its present name by virtue of Muslim Mindanao Autonomy Act No. 32 in 1994.

Geography

Barangays
Bacolod-Kalawi is politically subdivided into 26 barangays.

 Ampao
 Bagoaingud
 Balut
 Barua
 Buadiawani
 Bubong
 Daramoyod
 Dilabayan
 Dipatuan
 Gandamato
 Gurain
 Ilian
 Lama
 Liawao
 Lumbaca-Ingud
 Madanding
 Orong
 Pindolonan
 Poblacion I
 Poblacion II
 Raya
 Rorowan
 Sugod
 Tambo
 Tuka I
 Tuka II

Climate

Demographics

Economy

See also
List of renamed cities and municipalities in the Philippines

References

External links

MMA Act No. 32 : An Act Renaming the Municipality of Bacolod Grande in the Province of Lanao Del Sur into Municipality of Bacolod-Kalawi
Bacolod-Kalawi Profile at the DTI Cities and Municipalities Competitive Index
[ Philippine Standard Geographic Code]
Philippine Census Information
Local Governance Performance Management System

Municipalities of Lanao del Sur
Populated places on Lake Lanao